Bush River may refer to:

Canada 
 Bush River (British Columbia), a tributary of the Columbia River

United States 
 Bush River (Maryland), a tidal estuary
 Bush River (South Carolina), a tributary of the Saluda River
 Bush River (Virginia), a tributary of the Appomattox River

See also
 River Bush, County Antrim, Northern Ireland